Bounty, is a 2017 Rwandan documentary film directed by Shyaka Kagamé and produced by Florence Adam for Les Productions JMH. 

The film received positive reviews and won several awards at international film festivals. The film received critical acclaim and screened at several film festivals. The documentary is special due to no voice-overs, interviews or camera faces. The film deals with questions about the identity of black Afro–Swiss people.

Plot
The film deals with the daily lives of five people from very different backgrounds: Bacary, Winta, Jeffrey, Rili and Ayan in which all were born  or raised in Switzerland..

Cast

References

External links
 Bounty on YouTube

2017 films
Rwandan documentary films
2017 documentary films
Films shot in Rwanda